Jonte Green (born July 19, 1989) is a former American football cornerback. He was most recently a member of the Ottawa Redblacks of the Canadian Football League (CFL). He was selected in the sixth round, 196th overall, by the Detroit Lions in the 2012 NFL Draft. He played college football at New Mexico State. He has also been a member of the Detroit Lions, Buffalo Bills, Arizona Cardinals and Winnipeg Blue Bombers.

Professional career

Detroit Lions
Green was drafted by the Detroit Lions of the NFL in the 6th round of the 2012 NFL Draft, 196th overall. Green made an appearance in 24 games over his first two seasons in the NFL, accumulating 38 tackles, 7 pass defenses, 1 quarterback sack and 1 interception. He was released on August 26, 2014, two weeks prior to the start of the 2014 NFL season.

Buffalo Bills
On January 15, 2015, Green signed a futures contract with the Buffalo Bills. He was waived on April 27.

Arizona Cardinals
The Arizona Cardinals signed Green on August 4, 2015. He was waived on September 5 as part of the final roster cuts before the start of the 2015 season.

Winnipeg Blue Bombers 
Green signed with the Winnipeg Blue Bombers of the Canadian Football League (CFL) on February 22, 2016. He took part in training camp and preseason, but was released by the Bombers on June 18, 2016 prior to the start of the 2016 season.

Duke City Gladiators 
On December 17, 2016, Green signed with the Duke City Gladiators of Champions Indoor Football.

Ottawa Redblacks 
Green signed with the Ottawa Redblacks of the CFL on January 19, 2017. He was released by the Redblacks on May 1, 2017 as they trimmed their roster down to 75 players.

References

External links

 Detroit Lions bio
 New Mexico State profile
 

1989 births
Living people
American football cornerbacks
Canadian football defensive backs
American players of Canadian football
Detroit Lions players
Buffalo Bills players
Arizona Cardinals players
Ottawa Redblacks players
Winnipeg Blue Bombers players
New Mexico State Aggies football players
Players of American football from St. Petersburg, Florida
Players of American football from Tampa, Florida
Players of Canadian football from St. Petersburg, Florida
Players of Canadian football from Tampa, Florida
African-American players of American football
Duke City Gladiators players
21st-century African-American sportspeople
20th-century African-American people